This page shows the Province-wise list of dams and reservoirs in Pakistan According to the International Commission on Large Dams, 73 dams and reservoirs in Pakistan are over  in height. Tarbela Dam is the largest earth-filled dam in the world and is second largest by the structural volume. Mirani Dam is the largest dam in the world in terms of volume for flood protection with a floodstock of 588,690 cubic hectometers while Sabakzai Dam is 7th largest with a floodstock of 23,638 cubic hectometers. On 21 January 2021 Govt of Balochistan announce that it will build 16 new small dams in Balochistan. Similarly govt of Punjab announced 13 new small dam projects along with Suleman Mountain Ranges.

Large dams
The complete list of large dams in Pakistan is provided below.

Dams in Pakistan

Bold: major dams, height > 
NA: data unavailable

Azad Kashmir

Balochistan

Gilgit-Baltistan

Islamabad Capital Territory

Khyber Pakhtunkhwa 
.

Punjab

Sindh

Small dams
There are estimates Pakistan needs to build minimum 750 small dams to meet water requirements for its growing local and regional population.

Punjab 

 Basal Dam
Basal Dam is located about 16 km from Mithyal Chowk of Rawalpindi Kohat road in Attock, Punjab. Basal Dam was completed in 2009.

Chakwal District 
There are 13 small dams in Chakwal district having storage capacity of 26,411 in acres feet irrigating 11,089 acres of area.
 Khokher Zer Dam
 Surlah Dam 
 Dhok Talian Dam 
 Kot Raja Dam 
 Dhoke Qutab Din Dam 
 Nikka Dam
 Walana Dam
 Khai Gurabh Dam
 Pira Fatehal Dam
 Bhagtal Dam
 Dhurnal Dam
 Mial Dam
 Kanwal Dam
 Dhrabi Dam
 Khai Dam
 Chowkhandi Dam
 Minwal Dam

Jhelum District 
 Tain Pura Dam
 Jammergal Dam
 Garat Dam
 Salial Dam
 Domeli Dam
 Shah Habib Dam
 Gurha Utam Singh Dam
 Fatehpur Dam
 Lehri Dam
 Dungi Dam
 Nirali Dam
 Phalina Dam
 Pandori Dam

Rawalpindi 
 Jawa Dam
 Misriot Dam

Proposed and under construction

Balochistan
 Garuk Dam – proposed dam located on Garuk River, 47 km south east of Kharan District, Balochistan. The earth core rock-filled dam will have a height of 184 feet and a reservoir capacity of 50,695 acre feet. The reservoir when completed will irrigate a command area of 12,500 acres and will have hydro-power capacity of 300 KW.
 Pelar Dam – proposed dam located across Nai River in Awaran District, Balochistan. The concrete gravity dam will be 60 feet high and will have a gross storage capacity of 99,175 acre feet. It will irrigate a command area of 25,650 acres. Installed capacity of the power station will be 300 KW. Due to financial constraints, funding for the project was stopped in 2011.
 Winder Dam – proposed dam on Winder River, Balochistan about 125 km from Lasbela city. The earth core rockfill dam will be 102 feet high with a gross storage capacity of 36,484 acre-feet and a command area of 10,000 acres. It will have a hydro-power generation capacity of 300 KW.
Naulong Dam – is an embankment dam currently under construction on the Mula River, about 30 km from Gandawah City in Jhal Magsi district of Balochistan, Pakistan. The zoned earth-filled dam is 186 feet high with a gross storage of 0.242 MAF and a command area of 47,000 acres.  It has a hydro power capacity of 4.4 MW. 
 Khisar Dam – under construction
 Hingol Dam – proposed
 Sukleji Dam – proposed
 Badin Zai Dam – proposed

Islamabad
Chirah Dam – proposed

Gilgit Baltistan
Diamer-Bhasha Dam – under construction
Bunji Dam – proposed
Katzarah Dam – proposed

Khyber Pakhtunkhwa
Kurram Tangi Dam – under construction
Dasu Dam – under construction
Dotara Dam – proposed
Bara Dam – proposed
Mohmand Dam – under construction
Kalam Dam – under construction in Kalam Valley
Othla Dam – under construction
Jabba Dam – located in Jamrud Tehsil of Khyber District
Jalozai Dam – located in Pabbi Tehsil of Khyber District
 Tank Zam Dam – proposed
 Daraban Zam Dam – proposed

Punjab
 Akhori Dam – Attock, Punjab – proposed
 Dadhocha Dam – under construction
 Kalabagh Dam – proposed
 Papin Dam – proposed
 Chiniot Dam – proposed
 Murunj Dam – proposed
 Soan Dam – proposed
 Sora dam – proposed
 Rohtas Dam – proposed

Sindh
 Nai Gaj Dam – under construction
 Darawar Dam - under construction

See also

 List of barrages and headworks in Pakistan
 Hydropower Projects in Pakistan
 List of lakes in Pakistan
 Deserts of Pakistan
 Provinces of Pakistan
 Business ideas in Pakistan

References

P
Dams and reservoirs
 
Dams and reservoirs